The Ekumeku Movement consisted of a series of uprisings against the rising power of the Royal Niger Company of the British Empire by Anioma people in present-day Delta State. The British penetration of Nigeria met with various forms of resistance throughout the country. In the south, the British had to fight many wars, in particular the wars against the Aro of Eastern Igboland in 1901–1902, and from 1883 to 1914, the Anioma in Western Igboland.

History 
The opposition was strong in Anioma land where a series of wars were waged against the British. The Ekumeku, who were well organized and whose leaders were joined in secrecy oaths, effectively utilized guerrilla tactics to attack the British. Their forces, which were drawn from thousands of Anioma youth from all parts of Anioma land, created many problems for the British, but the British used forceful tactics and heavy armaments (destroying homes, farms, and roads) to prevail. The Ekumeku, however, became a great source of Anioma nationalism.

The Ekumeku Movement is unique in Anioma history and Igbo history in general for two reasons. First, the length of time the movement endured, comprising Military campaigns over a period of thirty-one years. Secondly, it is an outstanding example in the Anioma Civilization of an attempt to unite previously disunited states to resist the colonial army. You have seen that one crucial reason for Anioma's defeat was the great discrepancy of scale between the average Anioma community and the colonial army. The British decided on a preemptive strike, and in December 1902 sent a powerful expedition that systematically destroyed a number of towns and imprisoned their leaders. This, it was assumed, was the end of the Ekumeku.." the Ekumeku and other secret societies have been completely broken".

In 1904, the Ekumeku rose again. This time they changed their tactics, mistakenly, it would seem in retrospect, abandoning the united guerilla warfare of 1898 for the individual defense of each town. The last act of the Eureka drama began in late 1909. The occasion was a succession dispute in Ogwashi-Uku. One of the claimants, Nzekwe, the son of the last Obi, feared that the British would deprive him of his throne, and decided to fight for his inheritance.

On 2 November 1909, the British sent an expedition to Ogwashi-Uku but they failed in the expedition. The British perceived, in the whole Asaba hinterland, sympathy with the Ekumeku, and a disposition to throw off government authority. In 1911, there was a final round-up of Ekumeku leaders in various towns that were followed, once more, by imprisonments.

The acting lieutenant-governor of the southern provinces sent an agitated telegram to Lagos: "The whole country is above area...is the state of rebellion."  Reinforcements arrived from Lokoja, and the British proceeded to a confrontation at Akegbe.  We quote both the contemporary British accounts of the battle at Nkwo market.

The war 
With the invasion of Ndoni in 1870 and bombardment of Onicha-Ado (Onitsha) on 2 November 1897, the stage was set for the Ekumeku war that engulfed the whole of Anioma.  The Royal Niger Company (RNC) commanded by Major Festing engaged Ibusa in 1898, and in 1904 it was the people of Owa/Ukwunzu against the British in a war that W. E. B. Crawford Coupland requested for more arms to crush the western Anioma communities. Owa would once again engage the British in 1906 in battle that S. O. Crewe lost his own life. On 2 November 1909, it was finally the turn of Ogwashi-Ukwu who matched the British. In this war the British sustained many casualties with the death of H. C. Chapman.

Aftermath 
Although the Ekumeku failed in 1914, but the western Anioma treasure their memory as imperishable legacy. Heroes included Ikwa Gwadia of onicha-olona, Dunkwu Isus of Onicha-Olona, Nwabuzo Iyogolo of Ogwashi-Ukwu, Awuno Ugbo, Obi of Akumazi, Agbambu Oshue of Igbuzo, Idabor of Issele-Azagba, Ochei Aghaeze of Onicha-Olona, Abuzu of Idumuje-Unor, Idegwu Otokpoike of Ubulu-Ukwu are still remembered in Anioma land and Igboland in general. The Ekumeku War is one of the most vigorous campaign of opposition to the British empire and inspired later rebellions such as the Mau Mau of Kenya.

Bibliography

External links

Conflicts in 1883
Wars involving Igboland
British Empire
History of Nigeria
Wars involving the United Kingdom
19th century in Africa
1883 in Nigeria
1914 in Nigeria